Gabriel Sagard, O.M.R., (fl. 1614–1636) was a French lay brother and Recollect friar, a reform branch of the Order of Friars Minor known for their strict poverty. He was among the first Christian missionaries to New France, and is notable for his writings on the colony and on the Hurons (or Wendat).

Sagard's origins, and the dates of his birth and death are obscure.  Some historians say he was christened Théodat, others believe that Théodat was his religious name, which, however, is less likely as his signature on his works is under the name of Gabriel (see illustration).

Sagard arrived in New France 28 June 1623.  He was sent to accompany Father Nicholas Viel, where they joined four other members of their Order who had been there since 1615, led by Father Denis Jamet.  In August, Sagard traveled to a Huron village on the southern shore of Lake Huron, where he began his missionary work and study of the Huron language. In July 1624, he was ordered by his superiors to return to France. All record of him ends some time around 1636. Sagard seems to have either left the Order or he may simply have died while still a friar. Sagard worked with the Hurons.

Sagard is remembered for his writings on New France and the Hurons-Wyandot people,  (Paris, 1632). It is available online at the Champlain Society website. An authoritative edition of the dictionary of the Huron language was edited by John Steckley and published in 2009.

The geographic township of Sagard in Quebec, Canada, was named in his honour.

References

External links
 Sagard's Dictionary of Huron - The earliest and one of the most complete dictionaries of the Huron language

"Gabriel Sagard", Dictionary of Canadian Biography Online
Champlain Society Digital Collection
 
 
Excerpt from The Long Journey to the Country of the Hurons

Roman Catholic missionaries in New France
Recollects
Roman Catholic missionaries in Canada
French Roman Catholic missionaries
Year of birth unknown
Year of death unknown
Franciscan missionaries
French Franciscans